Corley is an unincorporated community in Bowie County, in the U.S. state of Texas. According to the Handbook of Texas, the community had a population of 35 in 2000. It is located within the Texarkana metropolitan area.

History
Corley was named for early settler John C. Corley. A post office was established at Corley in 1882 and remained in operation until the 1950s, with J. Carr Turner as postmaster. It had 75 residents served by a sawmill, a gristmill, a gin, a store, and a hotel in 1884. It went up to 100 in 1890 and lost half of it six years later. It further went down to 35 from 1982 through 2000 and had no businesses.

Geography

Education
Corley is served by the New Boston Independent School District.

References

Unincorporated communities in Bowie County, Texas
Unincorporated communities in Texas